Nell B. Dale is an American computer scientist noted for her work in computer science education and computer science introductory programming textbooks. She was on the Association for Computing Machinery's Special Interest Group on Computer Science Education Board from 1981–85, and from 1987–93, and was Chair of SIGCSE from 1991–93. She was Chair of the SIGCSE Symposium in 1991 and Co-Chair of the SIGCSE
Symposium in 2000.

Biography
Dale received a B.S. in Mathematics and Psychology from the University of Houston in 1960. She received a M.A. in Mathematics from University of Texas at Austin in 1964 and a Ph.D in Computer Science from University of Texas in Austin in 1972.

She joined the Department of Computer Science at the University of Texas at Austin as an instructor in 1975, then a lecturer in 1977, a Senior Lecturer in 1981, and retired in 2000.

Dale wrote 16 textbooks on Pascal, C++, Visual Basic, Java and Ada.

Bibliography
(with John Lewis) Computer Science Illuminated (5th Edition 2012). Jones and Bartlett.

Awards

In the year 2009
she was named an ACM Fellow.

Her other notable awards include:
 ACM Karl V. Karlstrom Educator Award (2001)
 IEEE Computer Society Taylor L. Booth Award (2013)
 SIGCSE Award for Outstanding Contribution to Computer Science Education (1996)

References

External links
 University of Texas at Austin: Nell B. Dale, Department of Computer Science

American women computer scientists
American computer scientists
University of Texas at Austin faculty
Fellows of the Association for Computing Machinery
Living people
Computer science educators
Year of birth missing (living people)
American women academics
21st-century American women